Saeed Al Nazari is the Director General of the Federal Youth Authority of the UAE, Executive Director of the Youth at the UAE Prime Minister’s Office, and Chief Strategy Officer of the Arab Youth Center. During his career, he has overseen more than fifty national projects, including the development of the National Youth Agenda and the Emirati Youth Empowerment Model in the UAE. He was also the founder of two startups: Leo Production and Boost Consultancy.

Education
Al Nazari holds a master’s degree in Leadership and Corporate Entrepreneurship, and a bachelor's degree in Business Administration – Human Resources from Higher Colleges of Technology, Abu Dhabi, UAE. Al Nazari is also a graduate from the Sheikh Mohammed Bin Zayed Scholars Program (SMSP), an international leadership program at New York University, UAE, which is an international leadership program. He has also completed the Knowledge and Human Development Authority’s Promising Leaders Program in the Republic of Mauritius. Al Nazari further took the professional management studies at the University of Cambridge and studied strategy and planning at the London Business School.

Award 
In 2015, Al Nazari was awarded the Mubadala Youth Award in recognition of his passion and achievements in promoting leadership, innovation and happiness through his work in society. He was also awarded Emirates Award for Arabian Gulf Youth 2014 for his project Factory of Dreams. Factory of Dreams is a proposed crowd-funding website designed specifically to help low-income young entrepreneurs.

Career
Al Nazari was the youngest Assistant Manager - HR at the Noor Bank, back in 2012. Earlier than his role, Al Nazari worked as a Project Manager in the Executive Office of His Highness Sheikh Mohammed bin Rashid Al Maktoum, where he got to work on strategic projects like the Arab Social Media Influencers Summit, the Arab Strategy Forum, and AREA 2071.

Youth Empowerment Programs & Initiatives 
Al Nazari has led and managed more than 50 national projects, including the Federal Youth Hub, National Emirates Youth Values Program, United Nations Youth Delegates Program, Emirates Youth Summer Academy, Young Economist Program, 100 Mentors Program, and the Youth Circles, which won the Mohammed Bin Rashid Government Excellence Award in the category of Distinguished Initiatives. As Chief Strategy Officer of the Arab Youth Centre, Al Nazari led and managed several regional initiatives and programs, including the Young Arab Media Leaders Program.

Al Nazari is also a member of the Global Shapers community of the World Economic Forum, the National Committee for Sustainable Development Goals, along with the Integration Committee for Human Resources Development. He is the youngest board member of the Global Social Media Club in the UAE, and has served as the Global Innovation Ambassador for the Global Innovation Management Institute.

Global Happiness Organization
Saeed Al Nazari is the current president of UAE chapter of Global Happiness Organization. The aim of the organization is to make people aware about happiness and to achieve Sheikh Mohammed bin Rashid Al Maktoum's (Vice President of the UAE and Ruler of Dubai) Dubai 2021's first objective “achieve people’s happiness”.

Dubai Health Authority Drone
He designed a drone for the Dubai health authority which can transport medical supplies and aid to patients at home or in emergencies. The drone was a semi-finalist in Dubai government's "Drone for good competition".

References

External links
Official Website

New York University alumni
Living people
Year of birth missing (living people)